Coolum Beach is a beachside town and coastal suburb in the Sunshine Coast Region, Queensland, Australia.

Geography 
Coolum Beach has the following mountains (from north to south):

 Mount Peregian (Mount Emu) 
 Toboggan Hill 
 Eurungunder Hill 
Coolum Beach has the following coastal features (from north to south):

 Peregian Beach, extending south from Peregian Beach to the north-east

 Coolum Beach, along the mid-coastline of the suburb
 Point Perry

However, Mount Coolum (to the south of the suburb) dominates the landscape.

History 
The town and locality take their name from the beach.

The area of what is today part of Coolum was located in the traditional lands of the Undanbi, who were part of the larger tribes of the Gubbi Gubbi peoples.
 
In the 19th century, Coolum was first encountered by Europeans, mainly castaways and later shipwrecked sailors. From 1871 to 1881, land grants were selected by Grainger Ward and Mark Blasdall with a total pastoral lease of 407 hectares.

Coolum Provisional School opened on 2 April 1917. In 1930, it became Coolum State School.

In December 1923, land in the Mt Coolum Beach Estate second section went to auction, following the successful sale of portions in the first section, and one month after the official opening of the Moreton Central Sugar Mill Cane Tramway extension to Coolum. All lots are described as having an uninterrupted view of the Pacific Ocean.

In 1931, the Coolum Beach branch of the Queensland Country Women's Association were donated a block of land and purchased the adjacent block at 7-9 Coolum Terrace. In 1965, a former school building was moved onto the block which was replaced with a new building in 1990. In 2013, the CWA decided that the hall was under-utilised and that its increasing property value should be realised to support other projects. The property was sold into private ownership on 21 September 2013 for $660,000.

Holy Spirit Anglican Church was dedicated on 14 November 1970.  It was consecrated by Archbishop Felix Arnott on 5 November 1977.

Coolum State High School opened on 29 January 1985.

The Coolum Library opened in 1989 with a major refurbishment in 1997.

In 2002, Coolum hosted the Commonwealth Heads of Government Meeting, replacing the 2001 meeting that was postponed and moved from Brisbane in the wake of the September 11 attacks.

Along with a number of other regional Australian newspapers owned by NewsCorp, the Coolum News newspaper ceased publication in June 2020.

Education

Coolum State School is a government primary (Prep-6) school for boys and girls at School Road. In 2018, the school had an enrolment of 1,025 students with 69 teachers (63 full-time equivalent) and 45 non-teaching staff (28 full-time equivalent). It includes a special education program.

Coolum State High School is a government secondary school for boys and girls at Havana Road East; the school services grades 7 through 12. In 2018, the school had an enrolment of 1,092 students with 88 teachers (84 full-time equivalent) and 34 non-teaching staff (26 full-time equivalent). It includes a special education program.

Despite the name, Coolum Beach Christian College is in neighbouring Yandina Creek.

Amenities 
The Sunshine Coast Regional Council operates a public library at 6 Park Street.

Coolum Beach Uniting Church is at 22-26 Elizabeth Street (corner of Heathfield Road).

Holy Spirit Anglican Church is 25 Beach Road (corner of Perry Street).

Attractions
Coolum Beach is a popular day trip and holiday destination. The town is focused around the beach, which is patrolled by life savers and offers swimming and surfing; in its day, the beach is known as one of the best breaks in Queensland. Parks, a boardwalk, esplanade shops, and the surf lifesaver club surround the beach. Over the last five years Coolum Beach has seen heavy development, with new buildings for retail business and holiday apartments.

Lows Lookout is a tourist attraction at the top of Grandview Drive on Toboggan Hill.

Public transport
Sunbus, a division of TransLink operates local buses.

The nearest railway station is Yandina Railway Station. From the Yanida Railway Station, there are Queensland Rail trains to Roma Street railway station in Brisbane, as well as a line to Ipswich and North Gympie.

Notable people
Notable people who are from or have lived in Coolum include:
 Essena O'Neill, internet celebrity who left social media
Julian Wilson, professional surfer competing in the World Surf League Men's Tour

References

Further reading

External links

 

Historical Aerial Images of Coolum Beach sourced at AeroStock

Suburbs of the Sunshine Coast Region
Beaches of Queensland
Towns in Queensland